The port of Luanda is an Angolan port located in the city of Luanda, the national capital, in the province of Luanda. It is connected to the city center of Luanda and the district of Ingombota. It is located in the Luanda Bay, which is separated from the Atlantic Ocean by the island of Luanda.

The port belongs to the Angolan government, which is responsible for its administration through the public company Porto de Luanda E.P.. This company was established to administer the license for terminals for loading and unloading, in addition to the passenger terminal.

Together with the ports of Lobito (Benguela), Moçamedes (Namibe), Soyo (Zaire) and Cabinda (Cabinda), it forms the largest port complexes in the country. It is the largest port in the country, in addition to being the main import and export terminal for long-haul cargo in the nation.

The port is the outlet point of the Luanda railway, which carries cargo from the city of Malanje in the Malanje Province. Another important outflow connection is made via the EN-100 highway.

References

Municipalities in Luanda
Luanda